Manuela Leggeri (born 9 May 1976 in Sezze) is a volleyball player who represented Italy twice (2000 and 2004) at the Summer Olympics. She was a member of the Women's National Team that won the gold medal at the 2002 World Championship in Germany. Leggeri made her international debut on 29 May 1994.

Individual awards
 2004 FIVB World Grand Prix "Best Blocker"

References
 Profile
 LegaVolley

External links
 

1976 births
Living people
Italian women's volleyball players
Volleyball players at the 2000 Summer Olympics
Volleyball players at the 2004 Summer Olympics
Olympic volleyball players of Italy